Barry William Blenkhorn (born September 30, 1954), better known by his stage name Barry Williams, is an American actor. He is best known for his role as the eldest of the Brady sons, Greg Brady, on the ABC television series The Brady Bunch (1969–1974), a role he reprised in several sequels and spin-offs.

Early life and career
Williams, the youngest of three boys, was born in 1954 in Santa Monica, California, to Doris May Moore and Canadian-born Frank Millar Blenkhorn, of English, Scottish, and German ancestry. Barry and siblings Craig and Scott Blenkhorn grew up in Pacific Palisades, California, where actor Peter Graves was a neighbor. Williams decided, as a child, that he wanted to be an actor, and in 1967 he made his television debut in a "Christmas" episode of Dragnet 1967.

Williams continued to be cast in guest roles on other TV series including Adam-12, The Invaders, That Girl, Mission: Impossible, The Mod Squad, Here Come the Brides, Gomer Pyle, U.S.M.C., and Bartleby, the Scrivener before being cast in 1969 as Greg Brady on The Brady Bunch.

Later career
Following the cancellation of The Brady Bunch in 1974, Williams continued to appear in guest roles on television, and became involved in musical theater, touring with productions such as Grease, The Sound of Music, Pippin, and West Side Story.

In 1988, Williams appeared on Broadway in the musical Romance/Romance with Tony Award-nominee Alison Fraser. Williams took over the lead male role of "Alfred/Sam" when Scott Bakula left the production. Years later, Williams was able to capitalize on being typecast as Greg Brady. Amid a procession of appearances in TV and movies that played up his famous teen role, he ended up landing a role that was a departure from the Brady image. He was tapped to play English con man Hannibal in 1984, who conspired with Holly Sutton Scorpio (Emma Samms) on the top-rated General Hospital.

Williams has appeared in various Brady Bunch TV movie reunions, including the 1988 Christmas movie, A Very Brady Christmas.

In 1989, Williams was honored by the Young Artist Foundation with its Former Child Star "Lifetime Achievement" Award for his role as Greg Brady.

His 1992 autobiography, Growing Up Brady: I Was A Teenage Greg, co-written with Chris Kreski, was a New York Times bestseller and was adapted into a 2000 TV movie titled Growing Up Brady starring Adam Brody as Williams.

In 2000, Williams sang a parody of Eminem's "The Real Slim Shady" called "The Real Greg Brady"; the song was co-written by Williams, comedy writer and radio producer, David Brody of Z100 NY WHTZ, and Jay Gilbert of WEBN Radio in Cincinnati.

Williams appeared briefly as an audience member in the 2002 music video of Peter Gabriel's song, "The Barry Williams Show". The song is actually about a fictional Jerry Springer-like talk show host, not the actor; Gabriel later revealed that he did not know of the Brady Bunch star when he wrote the song.

Williams has made multiple appearances as a paid featured dancer at the World's Largest Disco in Buffalo, New York.

In 2001–2002, he played Manager Dean "The Machine" Strickland in 13 episodes of the sitcom, Hollywood 7, which featured the British pop group S Club 7.

Williams played himself in the 2003 film Dickie Roberts: Former Child Star.

In 2008, Williams appeared in Episode 6 of the VH1 series, Celebrity Rehab with Dr. Drew. Williams participated as a friend of one of the patients, Chyna, and explained to her during a group session how drinking had a negative impact on his own life and career.

In January 2010, he took a role in The Asylum mockbuster, Mega Piranha, who played alongside the former teen pop singer Tiffany.

With the death of Florence Henderson on November 24, 2016, Williams became the oldest surviving (adult) cast member from The Brady Bunch.

As of 2019, he makes Branson, Missouri, his home and tours with the musical group Barry Williams and the Traveliers. He also joined with the other Brady Bunch kids in the 2019 television series A Very Brady Renovation on HGTV. In 2021, Williams starred in the Lifetime Christmas movie, Blending Christmas, alongside his Brady Bunch co-stars Christopher Knight, Mike Lookinland, Susan Olsen, and Robbie Rist.

In 2022, Williams, Knight, and Lookinland competed in season eight of The Masked Singer as "Mummies". They were eliminated on "TV Theme Night" alongside Daymond John as "Fortune Teller".

Actors' Equity Association dispute
In January 2001, Williams was fined $52,000 by Actors' Equity Association, the union representing stage actors, for starring as Captain Von Trapp in a non-union tour of The Sound of Music. According to Variety, the production was picketed in several cities. Williams responded by filing a complaint with the National Labor Relations Board, arguing that the fine was illegal because he had resigned from the union in September 2000 before the tour began. Equity alleged that Williams, who joined the union in 1974, was still a member when he began contract negotiations for the role.

Williams was reinstated by Actor's Equity as a member in good standing in 2005 after he unionized a non-Equity production of A Christmas Carol in late 2004.

Filmography

Film

Television

References

External links
 Interview with Barry Williams on "The Greg Brady Project"
 
 
 
 Williams' 70s Music Celebration! show at the Hughes Brothers Theatre in Branson, Missouri

1954 births
Living people
20th-century American male actors
21st-century American male actors
American male child actors
American male film actors
American male television actors
American male voice actors
American people of Canadian descent
American people of English descent
American people of German descent
American people of Scottish descent
Male actors from Santa Monica, California
Participants in American reality television series